The Jerusalem District Electricity Company (JDECO), previously the Jerusalem Electric and Public Service Corporation, is a Palestinian electricity distribution company established in its current form in 1956 that has the exclusive rights to supply electricity to consumers in the districts of East Jerusalem, Bethlehem, Ramallah and Jericho. The company does not have its own power stations, but buys over 95% of its electricity from Israel Electric Corporation (IEC) and the remainder from Jordan Electric Power Company (JEPCO), which can only be used in the Jericho district. JDECO supplies electricity to 30% of households in the West Bank and East Jerusalem. 

Palestinian Electricity Transmission Company (PETL) is currently the sole buyer of electricity in the Palestinian territories from IEC for distribution to the Palestinian electricity distributors, other than JDECO, who in turn distribute in their respective licence areas of West Bank Areas A and B. IEC distributes electricity in West Bank Area C. JDECO's activities in East Jerusalem are regulated by the Israel Electricity Authority, and in the West Bank by the Palestinian Authority (PA) or, in some cases, by the Israeli Civil Administration. JDECO recorded a net loss of about NIS 2.6 million in 2011. In 2012, JDECO owed NIS 458 million to IEC.

History 
The Jerusalem Electric and Public Service Corporation was founded as a government concession in Mandatory Palestine, first awarded to Euripides Mavrommatis, who then sold it to Balfour Beatty in 1928. The company was established in its current form in 1956 under Jordan authority.

JDECO has had a monopoly of supplying electricity in the larger Jerusalem area for nearly 100 years. Its first concession was signed during the British Mandate and was extended under Jordanian rule. In 1988, Jordan extended the concession for another 60 years, but Israel has only agreed to an extension until 2030. The Israel Electricity Authority has granted JDECO a 20-year license for electricity distribution in East Jerusalem, which currently runs to 2030, and an annually renewable license for the supply of electricity to consumers.

Organization 
JDECO is a joint-stock company. As at 2016, 25% of its shares were owned by the municipalities of Jerusalem, Ramallah, Al-Bireh, Bethlehem, Beit Sahour, Beit Jala and Jericho, while the remaining 75% were owned by over 3,000 private shareholders. The board of directors consists of 18 members: 9 representatives of the municipalities and 9 representatives of the private shareholders.

The company has four area branches, Jerusalem, Ramallah, Bethlehem and Jericho. In 2011, JDECO employed about 450 workers. The main Headquarters of the company is in Jerusalem's Bab A-Zahra neighborhood, north of the Old City.

Activities 
JDECO is responsible for connecting new consumers to the grid, as well as metering and billing. It has exclusive rights within its license areas. JDECO's activities in East Jerusalem are regulated by the Israel Electricity Authority, and in the West Bank by the Palestinian Authority (PA) or, in some cases, by the Israeli Civil Administration.

JDECO does not have its own power stations, but purchases over 95% of its electricity from Israel Electric Corporation (IEC) and the remainder from Jordan’s National Electric Power Company. Jordanian electricity is permitted to be used only in the Jericho district.

In 2011, all of the electricity distributed by the company in East Jerusalem was purchased from IEC. JDECO's activities in the Jerusalem area constitute about 1/3 of the company's total economic activity.

Debt to IEC 
Most of the electricity sold by JDECO is supplied by IEC. However, by 2012, JDECO's debt to IEC was NIS 458 million, and growing. By February 2015, IEC was owed NIS 1.9 billion, most of which was owed by the Palestinian Authority and JDECO.

On 23 February 2015, IEC cut electricity to the West Bank for about 45 minutes due to unpaid debts. Two days later it again cut electricity, stating it was a warning to the Palestinian Authority to begin paying down the debt. IEC stated that it is losing NIS 85 million per month on power supplied to Nablus and Jenin that is not being paid for, causing the majority of IEC's quarterly loss. The Palestinians accused IEC of collective punishment; while IEC stated that it operates independently of government and is treating this as it would any customer who does not pay its debts.

In March 2016, the debts were NIS 1.7 billion; and on 31 March, IEC cut power in the Jericho area, on 4 April, in the Bethlehem area, and the following day in the Hebron area. On 6 April, IEC restored full power to the West Bank after it received a payment of NIS 20 million, and an agreement to receive a full debt repayment schedule within seven days.

See also
 Israel Electric Corporation
 Electricity Authority (Israel)

References

External links
Website (Arabic)

Companies based in Jerusalem
Energy in the State of Palestine
1956 establishments in the West Bank Governorate